DJ Irene (born Irene M. Gutiérrez) is an American electronic dance music DJ and producer.

Discography

Albums
Hard House Diva (1998)
Global House Diva (2001)
Audio Underground (2002)
Global House Diva 2 (2002)
Phonosynthesis (2002)
Fearless (2003)
Rockstar (2004)
Live (2005)
Ultra.Trance 06 (2006)
Rockstar Royalty (2008)
Dissonance (2009)

Singles
"Weatha Beatin Hoochie Bitch" feat. Stacey Hollywood (1998)

References

External links
 
 
 
 [ DJ Irene at AllMusic.com]
 
 Interview with DJ Irene
  Article about DJ Irene at Los Angeles CityBeat
 DJ Irene Presents Stacey Hollywood (From The Arena) – Weatha Beatin Hoochie Bitch

American house musicians
American trance musicians
Club DJs
Electronic dance music DJs
Women DJs
Living people
Musicians from Downey, California
1962 births